Zeuctophlebia tapinodes is a species of moth of the family Geometridae. It was described by Alfred Jefferis Turner in 1904 and is known from Australia.

References

Moths described in 1904
Oenochrominae